Fenêtre sur l'avenir is a 1992 outdoor steel sculpture by Marcel Barbeau, installed at Montreal's McGill University, in Quebec, Canada.

References

External links

 

1992 establishments in Canada
1992 sculptures
McGill University
Outdoor sculptures in Montreal
Steel sculptures in Canada